The Wabash Heritage Trail is a hiking trail running from Fort Ouiatenon to the Tippecanoe Battlefield Park in Battle Ground, Indiana.

The path consists of approximately  miles of paved path and 7.5 miles of unpaved footpath. Bicycles are permitted on paved portions of the trail. Horses and motorized vehicles are not allowed on any portion of the trail.

References

Hiking trails in Indiana
Protected areas of Tippecanoe County, Indiana
National Recreation Trails in Indiana
Heritage trails